ARA Fournier (M-5) was a  of the Argentine Navy. She was in service from 1940 until her sinking in 1949.

Design and description 
The Bouchard-class minesweepers were the first large warships built in Argentina. They were intended to complement and eventually replace the Argentine Bathurst-class ships purchased from Germany after World War I.

The Bouchard class was based on the Bathurst-class design, with diesel engines instead of steam engines and larger calibre main armament. However, these ships had poor stability, which eventually led to the loss of Fournier in 1949.

The ships were armed with two single-mounted /47 calibre guns. For anti-aircraft defence, the minesweepers were equipped with one twin  mount. They also carried two  machine guns and were initially equipped with two depth charges. The Bouchard class had a complement of 62.

Service history

Fournier was built at the Sanchez shipyard in San Fernando. She was launched in 1939, and handed over from the shipyard on 13 October 1940.

On 21 September 1949, Fournier departed Río Gallegos for Ushuaia. The minesweeper never made contact again, and was declared missing on 28 September. All hands on board, initially reported as 60 but later established to be 77, were lost.

Footnotes

Citations

Bibliography

Further reading 
 
 LA PERDIDA DEL A.R.A. "FOURNIER" - "Histarmar" website (accessed 2018-12-26)

Bouchard-class minesweepers
1940 ships
Maritime incidents in 1949
Ships built in Argentina